Marion Lüttge ( Gräfe; born 25 November 1941) is a former East German javelin thrower. Lüttge won the gold medal at the 1966 European Championships in Budapest.

Biography
Lüttge was born in Leipzig, Saxony and had worked as a chemist before devoting herself to athletics. In 1963, she married the hammer thrower Friedrich Lüttge, the brother of shot putter Johanna Lüttge.

Lüttge was the East German champion in the javelin in 1962, 1963 and 1966. She also established three national records during her career; she recorded the last of these on 2 September 1966 with a personal best throw of 59.70m during qualification for the final of the 1966 European Championships.

References

1941 births
Living people
East German female javelin throwers
Athletes from Leipzig
European Athletics Championships medalists